Rugby union is played in Tuvalu. Unlike most South Pacific islands, rugby union is largely played on an informal basis alongside football (soccer), which is the main sport played by Tuvaluans.

The Tuvalu Rugby Union, an organising body for Rugby Union, was established in 2007 with the intention of forming a national team.

History
The Tuvalu Rugby Union organises a rugby tournament for teams from each island, and also selects a national team. Tuvalu participated in the Rugby Sevens competition in the XIVth Pacific Games in 2011. It is also a featured sport at the Tuvalu Games.

On the main island of Funafuti a rugby union competition is organised between teams based on the home island of the team members, such as the 'Niutao Sharks'.

Tuvalu's main problems are geographical - its population of 11,992 makes it the third-least-populated independent country in the world, with only Vatican City and Nauru having fewer inhabitants. It is also one of the smallest member by population of the United Nations. In terms of physical land size, at just  Tuvalu is the fourth smallest country in the world, larger only than the Vatican City—0.44 km2; Monaco—1.95 km2 and Nauru—21 km2. It comprises four reef islands and five true atolls. All of this makes a rugby infrastructure difficult to construct.

Tuvalu's close relationship with New Zealand and Australia, however, ensures that rugby union gets a lot of media coverage in Tuvalu.

See also

 Tuvalu national rugby sevens team
 Tuvalu Rugby Union

External links
 Rugby union starts up
 (Tuvaluan) Lakapii ko kamata i Tuvalu
 Federation of Oceania Rugby Unions
Rugby sevens at the 2011 Pacific Games

References